Fairfax is a city in Linn County, Iowa, United States. The population was 2,828 at the time of the 2020 census.  It is part of the Cedar Rapids Metropolitan Statistical Area.

History
Fairfax was laid out in 1863 when the railroad was extended to that point. It was named after Fairfax County, Virginia.

Geography
Fairfax is located at  (41.919714, -91.780295).

Demographics

2010 census
As of the census of 2010, there were 2,123 people, 782 households, and 608 families living in the city. The racial makeup of the city was 96.1% White, 1.2% African American, 0.2% Native American, 1.1% Asian, 0.5% from other races, and 0.8% from two or more races. Hispanic or Latino of any race were 1.4% of the population.

There were 782 households, of which 40.8% had children under the age of 18 living with them, 65.5% were married couples living together, 8.8% had a female householder with no husband present, 3.5% had a male householder with no wife present, and 22.3% were non-families. 18.2% of all households were made up of individuals, and 6% had someone living alone who was 65 years of age or older. The average household size was 2.71 and the average family size was 3.07.

The median age in the city was 36.6 years. 28.9% of residents were under the age of 18; 6.2% were between the ages of 18 and 24; 29.1% were from 25 to 44; 25.9% were from 45 to 64; and 9.8% were 65 years of age or older. The gender makeup of the city was 49.2% male and 50.8% female.

2000 census
As of the census of 2000, there were 889 people, 327 households, and 263 families living in the city. The racial makeup of the city was 96.63% White, 0.90% African American, 0.45% Asian, 0.67% from other races, and 1.35% from two or more races. Hispanic or Latino of any race were 1.80% of the population.

There were 327 households, out of which 37.9% had children under the age of 18 living with them, 65.7% were married couples living together, 10.4% had a female householder with no husband present, and 19.3% were non-families. 17.7% of all households were made up of individuals, and 7.6% had someone living alone who was 65 years of age or older. The average household size was 2.72 and the average family size was 3.05.

28.9% are under the age of 18, 6.6% from 18 to 24, 28.1% from 25 to 44, 22.9% from 45 to 64, and 13.4% who were 65 years of age or older. The median age was 37 years. For every 100 females, there were 99.3 males. For every 100 females age 18 and over, there were 96.9 males.

The median income for a household in the city was $57,850, and the median income for a family was $59,348. Males had a median income of $41,932 versus $29,643 for females. The per capita income for the city was $19,583. About 3.0% of families and 2.9% of the population were below the poverty line, including 2.6% of those under age 18 and 3.9% of those age 65 or over.

Notable people
 Mattie Blaylock, common-law wife of Wyatt Earp
 Donald Gurnett, physicist

References

External links 
 City Data Statistical Data and more about Fairfax, Iowa

Cities in Iowa
Cities in Linn County, Iowa
Cedar Rapids, Iowa metropolitan area
1863 establishments in Iowa